Baron
Franz von Paula (Franciscus de Paula) Gruithuisen (19 March 1774 – 21 June 1852) was a Bavarian physician and astronomer. He taught medical students before becoming a professor of astronomy at the University of Munich in 1826.

During his period of medical studies and instruction, he was noted for his contributions to urology and lithotripsy. He developed ideas on safer methods to remove bladder stones transurethrally, and his instruments served as models for subsequent devices.

Like others before and since his time, Gruithuisen believed that the Earth's Moon was habitable. He made multiple observations of the lunar surface that supported his beliefs, including his announcement of the discovery of a city in the rough terrain to the north of Schröter crater he named the Wallwerk. This region contains a series of somewhat linear ridges that have a fishbone-like pattern, and, with the small refracting telescope he was using, could be perceived as resembling buildings complete with streets. He published his observations in 1824, but they were greeted with much skepticism by other astronomers of the time. His claims were readily refuted using more powerful instruments. Gruithuisen was also the first to suggest that craters on the Moon were caused by meteorite impacts.

He is also noted for the discovery of bright caps on the cusps of the crescent Venus, which he attempted to explain by proposing that jungles on Venus grew more rapidly than in Brazil due to the proximity of the planet to the Sun, and that as a consequence the planet's inhabitants celebrated fire festivals during which they burned massive amounts of vegetation.

Gruithuisen lived at 24 Brienner Straße in Munich shortly before his death. The crater Gruithuisen on the Moon is named for him.

Bibliography
Baron von Gruithuisen was noted for his prolific rate of publication.
Ueber die Existenz der Empfindung in den Köpfen und Rümpfen der Geköpften und von der Art, sich darüber zu belehren (Augsburg 1808)
Ueber die Natur der Kometen, mit Reflexionen auf ihre Bewohnbarkeit und Schicksale, 1811.
Discovery of Many Distinct Traces of Lunar Inhabitants, Especially of One of Their Colossal Buildings, 1824.
Der Mond und seine Natur, 1844

References

Epic Moon — A History of Lunar Exploration in the Age of the Telescope, William P. Sheehan and Thomas A. Dobbin, Willmann-Bell, Inc., 2001, .
Franz von Paula Gruithuisen (1774–1852): lithotrity pioneer and astronomer. On the 150th anniversary of his death, Zajaczkowski, Zamann, and Rathert, World Journal of Urology, Vol. 20, No. 6, May 2003.

1774 births
1852 deaths
19th-century German astronomers